Rutilograptis couteauxi is a species of moth of the family Tortricidae. It is found in the Democratic Republic of the Congo and Nigeria.

The larvae probably feed on Coccidae species, a family of scale insects.

References

Moths described in 1940
Tortricini